Dejan Martinović (born July 19, 1983 in Doboj) is a Bosnian-Herzegovinian former footballer.  He also has Croatian nationality.

Martinović has played abroad with Hajduk Split, FC Terek Grozny, FC Brașov and FC Okzhetpes.

References

External links

1983 births
Living people
People from Doboj
Croats of Bosnia and Herzegovina
Association football midfielders
Bosnia and Herzegovina footballers
HŠK Posušje players
HNK Hajduk Split players
FSV Oggersheim players
NK Žepče players
FC Akhmat Grozny players
NK Široki Brijeg players
FC Brașov (1936) players
NK Čelik Zenica players
FC Okzhetpes players
FK Sloga Doboj players
Premier League of Bosnia and Herzegovina players
Croatian Football League players
Oberliga (football) players
Russian Premier League players
Liga I players
Kazakhstan Premier League players
Bosnia and Herzegovina expatriate footballers
Expatriate footballers in Croatia
Bosnia and Herzegovina expatriate sportspeople in Croatia
Expatriate footballers in Germany
Bosnia and Herzegovina expatriate sportspeople in Germany
Expatriate footballers in Russia
Bosnia and Herzegovina expatriate sportspeople in Russia
Expatriate footballers in Romania
Bosnia and Herzegovina expatriate sportspeople in Romania
Expatriate footballers in Kazakhstan
Bosnia and Herzegovina expatriate sportspeople in Kazakhstan